The Recueil des Travaux Chimiques des Pays-Bas was the Dutch scientific journal for chemistry. It was established in 1882, but from 1897 (vol. 16) to 1919 (vol 38) it was published under the title Recueil des Travaux Chimiques des Pays-Bas et de la Belgique (CODEN: RTCPB4). From 1980 (vol. 99) to 1984 (vol. 103), the journal was published under the title Recueil: Journal of the Royal Netherlands Chemical Society (CODEN: RJRSDK), but in 1985 (vol. 104), the title changed back to the original one. In 1997, the journal merged with Chemische Berichte and Liebigs Annalen to form Chemische Berichte/Recueil and Liebigs Annalen/Recueil, respectively.

In 1998 this journal was absorbed by the European Journal of Organic Chemistry and the European Journal of Inorganic Chemistry.

See also
 Anales de Química
 Chemische Berichte
 Bulletin de la Société Chimique de France
 Bulletin des Sociétés Chimiques Belges
 European Journal of Organic Chemistry
 European Journal of Inorganic Chemistry
 Gazzetta Chimica Italiana
 Liebigs Annalen
 Chimika Chronika
 Revista Portuguesa de Química
 ACH—Models in Chemistry

External links
 
 Recueil des Travaux Chimiques des Pays–Bas (1883-1894) in PDF format

Chemistry journals
Publications established in 1882
Publications disestablished in 1996
Multilingual journals
Monthly journals
Defunct journals
Academic journals published by learned and professional societies